Edward Bernard Carter (born August 22, 1971) is a former American football linebacker who played for the Jacksonville Jaguars of the National Football League (NFL). He played college football at East Carolina University.

References 

1971 births
Living people
Players of American football from Tallahassee, Florida
American football linebackers
East Carolina Pirates football players
Jacksonville Jaguars players